Rhode Montijo (born January 17, 1973) is an American children's book author and illustrator best known as the creator of Pablo's Inferno, Cloud Boy and co-creator of the Flash cartoon Happy Tree Friends.

Career
Raised in Stockton, California, Montijo is most known for being one of the creators of the award-winning comic book series Pablo's Inferno, about a little boy's descent into the spirit world in Mexico. Montijo originally gained attention for being one of the creators of the animated internet series Happy Tree Friends, one of the earliest YouTube viral sensations and subject of a 2006 television series.

After a car accident in 2006, Montijo set out to pursue his life-long passion in creating children's books. His first children's book published was the acclaimed Cloud Boy in 2006 by Simon & Schuster, about a little cloud boy who creates the shapes that are seen in clouds. Starting in 2007, Montijo illustrated a series of eight chapter books titled Melvin Beederman Superhero, written by Greg Trine and published by Henry Holt Company. In 2009 Montijo self-published and distributed Skeletown, a Dia De Los Muertos / Day of the Dead-inspired story of a town populated with skeletal inhabitants. In 2010, Montijo created The Halloween Kid about a mysterious masked boy who becomes the defender of Halloween. In 2012, production began on a half-hour animated holiday special based on The Halloween Kid with animation by Sanzigen Company in Japan, with Montijo directing.

In 2012, Montijo began a new children's chapter book series titled The Gumazing Gum Girl!, published by Disney/Hyperion, about gum-obsessed Gabby Gomez who accidentally turns into the sticky/stretchy superhero Gum Girl. In 2015 Montijo did the character designs for the Amazon Prime children's animated pilot, Knickerbock Teetertop, about the smallest kid in Wonderpine Mountain who yearns to be a great adventurer like his grandfather. Montijo has also provided character designs for Laika Pictures and Warner Brothers Animation.

Bibliography

Pablo's Inferno (5-issue comic book mini-series) (Abismo, 1999)
Cloud Boy (Simon & Schuster, 2006)
The Three Swingin' Pigs  Illustrator (Henry Holt & Company, 2007)
Melvin Beederman Superhero (Chapter Book Series) (2006-2010): Illustrator
Melvin Beederman Superhero v1 : Curse of the Bologna Sandwich Illustrator (144 pages, Henry Holt & Company, 2006) 
Melvin Beederman Superhero v2: The Revenge of the McNasty Brothers Illustrator (144 pages, Henry Holt & Company, 2006)
Melvin Beederman Superhero v3: The Grateful Fred Illustrator (144 pages, Henry Holt & Company, 2006)
Melvin Beederman Superhero v4: Terror in Tights Illustrator (144 pages, Henry Holt & Company, 2007)
Melvin Beederman Superhero v5 The Fake Cape Caper Illustrator (144 pages, Henry Holt & Company, 2007)
Melvin Beederman Superhero v6: Attack of the Valley Girls" Illustrator (144 pages, Henry Holt & Company, 2008)Melvin Beederman Superhero v7: Brotherhood of the Traveling Underpants Illustrator (144 pages, Henry Holt & Company, 2009)Melvin Beederman Superhero v8: Invasion from Planet Dork Illustrator (149 pages, Henry Holt & Company, 2010)T-t-tartamudo (mini comic book) (Abismo, 2010)The Halloween Kid (Simon & Schuster, 2010)Skeletown (preview book) (Abismo, 2011)Lucky Luis  Illustrator (Putnam, 2012)Super Grammar  Illustrator (Scholastic, 2012)The Gumazing Gum Girl!'' (Disney-Hyperion, 2013–present ), 5 volumes

See also
Big Umbrella

References

External links 
 
 

American animators
American animated film directors
American people of Mexican descent
Living people
1973 births
People from El Centro, California